Elise Wærenskjold (February 19, 1815 – January 22, 1895) was a Norwegian-American writer, temperance leader and early pioneer in Texas.

Background
Elise Amalie Tvede Wærenskjold was born in Dypvåg parish in Tvedestrand in the county of Aust-Agder, Norway. She was the daughter of Lutheran parish priest Nicolai Sejersløv Tvede (1779–1832) and  Johanne Elisabeth Meldahl (1773–1839), both of whose families were Danish-born patriots of the newly formed independent country of Norway. Educated by private tutors, she became a teacher and later opening a handicraft school for girls. She became involved in the national temperance movement and became editor of a Norwegian temperance magazine.

In 1839, she married a young sea captain, Svend Foyn. The marriage, which began without the customary reading of banns, ended in an amicable separation in 1842. Svend Foyn later became the founder of Norway's modern whaling industry and became a powerful and wealthy figure in modern Norwegian history.

Immigrant pioneer
When Christian and Johan Reinert Reiersen immigrated to Texas, she assumed the editorship of their  popular magazine Norge og Amerika, a position which she held from 1846 until she herself immigrated to Texas in 1847.  In October 1847, she first joined a Norwegian immigrant colony in Brownsboro, Texas.  On September 10, 1848, she married the leader of the immigrating party, Danish-Norwegian Wilhelm Wærenskjold. The Waerenskjold family relocated to Four Mile Prairie in Kaufman County and began raising cattle. The couple took an active part in the life of the Norwegian immigrant community, in the affairs of the local Lutheran church, and in the temperance movement. In 1866 both her husband Wilhelm and her youngest son Thorwald died.<ref>{{Cite web |url=http://www.naha.stolaf.edu/pubs/nas/volume25/vol25_5.htm |title=Soldiers in Confederate Forces (by C. A. Clausen & Derwood Johnson. Norwegian-American Historic Association, Volume 25: Page 105 Northfield, Minnesota |access-date=2009-05-29 |archive-date=2008-08-28 |archive-url=https://web.archive.org/web/20080828120129/http://www.naha.stolaf.edu/pubs/nas/volume25/vol25_5.htm |url-status=live }}</ref>

Writings
Elise Wærenskjold persevered through the hard years of drought, plagues of insects, and poverty on her farm. She taught school and she wrote for various Norwegian publications.  She  held to her belief in equal rights for women and her opposition to slavery and steadfastly maintained her stand on temperance. Her numerous writings including letters from the late 1840s through the mid-1890s remain an invaluable source of information on Norwegian immigrant life in Texas. In 1961, her writings were translated into the English language and published under the title Lady With the Pen: Elise Wærenskjold in Texas.References

Additional sources
Qualey, Carlton C. Norwegian Settlement in the United States (Norwegian-American Historical Association. Northfield, Minnesota. 1938)
Nelson, Estelle G. A First Lady of Texas (Our Lutheran Heritage. Minneapolis, Minnesota:  1943)
Blegen, Theodore C. Land of Their Choice: The Immigrants Write Home (Minneapolis: University of Minnesota Press, 1955)
 Crawford, Ann Fears  and Crystal Sasse Ragsdale Texas Women: From Frontier to Future (State House Press. 1998)
 Lovoll, Odd Sverre The Promise of America (University of Minnesota Press; Revised edition. 1999)

Further reading
Charles H. Russell, PhD,  Undaunted: A Norwegian Woman in Frontier Texas (Texas A&M University Press. 2005)  
Clausen C. A., ed., The Lady with the Pen: Elise Waerenskjold in Texas'' (Norwegian-American Historical Association, Northfield, Minnesota. 1961)
Charles H. Russell, PhD, "Light on the Prairie" (Shining Brightly Books. 2010)

External links
The Handbook of Texas
Great Texas Women
Daughters of Norway. Elise Wærenskjold Lodge #48
The Promise of America
 Agnes Mathilde Wergeland and Elise Wærenskjold. Daughters of Norway Norwegian

Norwegian people of Danish descent
People from Kristiansand
People from Tvedestrand
People from Kaufman County, Texas
American Lutherans
Norwegian emigrants to the United States
Norwegian newspaper editors
1815 births
1895 deaths
Norwegian feminists
Women newspaper editors
19th-century American journalists
19th-century Norwegian writers
19th-century American women writers
19th-century Norwegian women writers
19th-century Lutherans